The article contains information about the 2011–12 Iran 3rd Division football season. This is the 4th rated football league in Iran after the Persian Gulf Cup, Azadegan League, and 2nd Division. The league competition started from 2 October 2011.

From the First Round, 12 teams go through the Second Round. From that round four team will be promoted directly to 2012–13 Iran Football's 2nd Division, and two teams go through the play-off where the winner also will be promoted.

Teams
In total and in the first round, 69 teams will compete in 6 different groups. These teams will be divided into the following groups.

Group 1

Group 3

Group 5

Group 2

Group 4

Group 6

First Round (standings)

Group 1

Group 2

Group 3

Group 4

Group 5

Group 6

Second Round (standings)

Group A

Group B

Final

Championship final
The single match to be played on 7 June 2012

Third place play-off

Play-off

Promotion play-off

The winner will be promoted to 2012–13 Iran Football's 2nd Division.

Relegation play-off

The losers will be relegated to Provincial Leagues

Player statistics

Top scorers

References

External links
 آیین نامه مسابقات لیگ دسته اول، دسته دوم و دسته سوم کشور فصل 91-90

League 3 (Iran) seasons
4